Riginaldo Lucarini, O.P. (died 1671) was a Roman Catholic prelate who served as Bishop of Città della Pieve (1643–1671).

Biography
Riginaldo Lucarini was ordained a priest in the Order of Preachers.
On 9 February 1643, he was appointed during the papacy of Pope Urban VIII as Bishop of Città della Pieve.
On 15 February 1643, he was consecrated bishop by Alessandro Cesarini (iuniore), Cardinal-Deacon of Sant'Eustachio, with Giovanni Battista Altieri, Bishop Emeritus of Camerino, and Giovanni Battista Scanaroli, Titular Bishop of Sidon, serving as co-consecrators. 
He served as Bishop of Città della Pieve until his death on 8 October 1671. 
While bishop, he was the principal co-consecrator of Carlo Bonafaccia, Bishop of Ortona a Mare e Campli (1653); and Carlo Giuliani, Bishop of Stagno (1653).

References

External links and additional sources
 (for Chronology of Bishops) 
 (for Chronology of Bishops)  

17th-century Italian Roman Catholic bishops
Bishops appointed by Pope Urban VIII
Dominican bishops
1671 deaths
Year of birth missing